The 1926 Furman Purple Hurricane football team represented Furman University as a member of the Southern Intercollegiate Athletic Association (SIAA) during the 1926 college football season. Led by 12th-year head coach Billy Laval, the Purple Hurricane compiled an overall record of 8–1–1 with a mark of 3–1–1 in SIAA play. The team was coached by Billy Laval.

Schedule

References

Furman
Furman Paladins football seasons
Furman Purple Hurricane football